David Mayer (born 1928) is Emeritus Professor of Drama and Honorary Research Professor at the University of Manchester. He was accidentally placed on a US terrorism blacklist due to a case of mistaken identity.

In 2016, Mayer discovered that he had been placed on a US security list because a Chechen militant called Akhmed Chatayev, who was wanted by US authorities, had used the alias 'David Mayer'. The case of mistaken identity meant Mayer could not travel to the US or receive mail from the US.

As of November 2020, Mayer was still encountering bureaucratic problems as a result of his name being on a watchlist.

As a theatre historian, his work centres on the "drama of the long 19th century and with the late-Victorian stage’s many links with early [silent] film." In 2012, he received the American Society for Theatre Research (ASTR) Distinguished Scholar Award. In 2017, Mayer supported a campaign to save Harker's Studio, one of the last theatre scenery workshops in the UK.

His publications include Stagestruck Filmmaker, about the film director D.W. Griffith and Harlequin in His Element: The English Pantomime, 1806–1836.

Mayer is a US Army veteran and the father of the UK Women's Equality Party founder Catherine Mayer, and writer and activist Lise Mayer, who co-created the sitcom The Young Ones.

References 

1928 births
Living people
Writers from Chicago
21st-century American male writers
21st-century American historians
20th-century American historians
Academics of the University of Manchester
20th-century American male writers
American expatriate academics
American expatriates in the United Kingdom
Historians of theatre